Alejandro Lazo (born February 23) is a Cuban-American professional dancer, instructor, and choreographer based in Palm Beach, Florida. Lazo was the US International Rising Star Latin Champion in 1990 and went on through over twenty years of successful DanceSport competition. This cumulated in 1999 when he became the U.S. Nine-Dance Champion. He has appeared numerous times in television and theater in various capacities, and has also transitioned into the world of broadcast media as a spokesperson, guest host, and artist. He hosted several national PBS specials including "WXEL Presents", "Tango: The Spirit of Argentina", and "Fiesta at the Philharmonic".

Alec is the Owner/Founder of: "Paramount Ballroom" a premiere ballroom dance studio in Palm Beach Florida, which has been a training site for Dancing With the Stars Cheryl Burke and Cristián de la Fuente during Season 6 of Dancing with the Stars. 
More recently, Florence Henderson, better known as Carol Brady from The Brady Bunch, and Latin dance champion Corky Ballas trained at Paramount for D.W.T.S. Season 11.

Lazo currently travels across the United States judging competitions, lecturing, coaching, consulting, and performing. He is a Dance Vision International (DVIDA) certified instructor alongside such names as Maksim Chmerkovskiy and Buddy Schwimmer.

Titles
 U.S. International Rising Star Latin Champion
 U.S. Nine-Dance Champion
 U.S. Grand Finalist
 U.S. Rhythm Finalist
 U.S. Latin Top Ten Finisher (7x)
 Ohio Star Ball Latin Rising Star Champion
 Texas Challenge Rising Star Grand Champion
 Heritage Classic Rising Star Latin Champion
 Sunshine State Rhythm and Smooth Champion
 Grand National Rhythm and Smooth Champion
 Northwest Star Ball Rhythm and Smooth Champion
 Northwest Star Ball Nine-Dance Champion
 Southern States Open Rhythm Champion
 Top Teacher: Dance Heat U.S.A. 2009

Credentials
Fellow: North American Dance Teachers Association
Licentiate: Imperial Society of Teachers of Dancing
Dual Master Examiner: World Professional Dance Teachers Association
Examiner: International Dancers Association (DIVDA)
Registered Adjudicator N.D.C.A.: A+B+C+
Registered Championship Adjudicator N.D.C.A.

Film

Television

References

External links 
Official Website
AccessDance Network Page
Alec Lazo - Alec's MySpace
Alec Lazo - Alec's Facebook
Alec Lazo - Alec on Twitter
Alec Lazo - Alec on YouTube
DanceVision Instructor Profile

Living people
People from Havana
American people of Cuban descent
Year of birth missing (living people)
American male dancers
American ballroom dancers
People from Palm Beach, Florida